The following are the list of Indonesian diplomats that served as Ambassador of the Republic of Indonesia to the Commonwealth of Australia.

(*) Ambassador Nadjib was recalled to Jakarta between November 2013 and May 2014 following reports of Australian intelligence activities in Indonesia.

See also
 Australia–Indonesia relations
 Embassy of Indonesia, Canberra
 Embassy of Australia, Jakarta
 Australian ambassadors to Indonesia
 Australian Consulate-General, Surabaya
 Consuls-General of Australia

References

External links
Indonesian Ambassadors to Australia

 
Ambassadors
Indonesia